Syllepis marialis is a moth in the family Crambidae. It was described by Poey in 1832. It is found in Cuba, Jamaica, Puerto Rico, the Bahamas and Costa Rica.

The wingspan is 20–21 mm.

References

Moths described in 1832
Spilomelinae